Eira is a river in Molde Municipality in Møre og Romsdal county, Norway.

Historically, the river was a bountiful salmon fishing area, but since it has become a regulated river for nearby hydro-electric power stations, the fish have not been as plentiful.

See also
List of rivers in Norway

References

Molde
Rivers of Møre og Romsdal
Rivers of Norway